Yxaiio pheromones - the aphrodisiac drink ('Yxaiio' for short) is a drink from the Austrian company Yxaiio GmbH. The drink is available in 196 ml aluminium bottles. According to the manufacturer’s specifications, Yxaiio’s purportedly effective substance is the aroma, which contains the scent of pheromones.

The product was launched in the Spanish market in 2008. 
In the same year, a 4-month series of events (Yxaiio night) at the El Divino club in Ibiza was held, followed by more Yxaiio nights in Barcelona, Madrid and Hamburg. In 2010, Yxaiio GmbH launched its product in Chile and Portugal, 2011 in Brazil, and 2012 in Thailand.

At the international foodbev.com Beverage Innovation Awards 2009, Yxaiio pheromones – the aphrodisiac drink was assigned 'highly commended' in the category 'Best labelling or decorative finish’.

External links 
 Official website

References 

Non-alcoholic drinks
Products introduced in 2008